Paper Chasin' is  the second studio album by Suga-T. It was released on February 27, 1996 through Sick Wid It and Jive Records.

Background
After releasing It's All Good independently, Paper Chasin was Suga-T's major label debut as Sick Wid It Records had signed a distribution deal with Jive Records the year before. The album found success on the Billboard Top R&B/Hip-Hop Albums and Top Heatseekers, peaking at 28 and 13 respectively, but did not make a huge impact on the Billboard 200, only making it to 193. Nonetheless, Paper Chasin remains Suga-T's most successful album and to date is her only one to reach the Billboard 200.

Reception

AllMusic – "...Paper Chasin' , is an improvement over the somewhat unformed It's All Good. Paper Chasin'  remains unfocused, but the multitude of hip-hop and R&B styles, as well as the bevy of guest stars, makes the record interesting. Suga T never manages to tie all of her loose ends together, but taken individually many of the songs are quite good."

Track listing
"Recognize"- 4:34 
"If U Don't Want None"- 4:34 (featuring Filthy Rich)
"Hustlas and Tendas"- 4:02 (featuring B-Legit and Funk Mobb)
"Fuckin' Around Wit' Suga"- 4:38 (featuring B-Legit) 
"The Playas"- 3:48 
"Wanna Get"- 3:03 
"U Don't See Wanna See Me"- 4:50 (featuring E-40)
"Should I"- 3:45 
"Did That"- 3:57 
"Hustlin' 4 Life"- 3:36 
"Suga Daddy"- 3:17 
"What U Gone Do"- 4:35 
"Recognize"- 0:34

Charts

References

1996 albums
Jive Records albums
Sick Wid It Records albums
Suga-T albums